Xenon dioxide, or xenon(IV) oxide, is a compound of xenon and oxygen with formula XeO2 which was  synthesized in 2011. It is synthesized at 0 °C by hydrolysis of xenon tetrafluoride in aqueous sulfuric acid: XeF4 + 2H2O -> XeO2 + 4HF

Structure

 has an extended (chain or network) structure in which xenon and oxygen have coordination numbers of four and two respectively. The geometry at xenon is square planar, consistent with VSEPR theory for four ligands and two lone pairs (or AX4E2 in the notation of VSEPR theory).

In addition, the existence of an XeO2 molecule was predicted by an ab initio quantum chemistry method several years earlier by Pyykkö and Tamm, but these authors did not consider an extended structure.

Properties

 is a yellow-orange solid. It is an unstable compound, with a half-life of about two minutes, disproportionating into  and xenon gas. Its structure and identity was confirmed by cooling it to −78 °C so that Raman spectroscopy could be performed before it decomposed.

3 XeO2 → Xe + 2 XeO3

References

Oxides
Xenon(IV) compounds
Inorganic compounds
Substances discovered in the 2010s